Lijariki-ye Hasan Rud (also Romanized as Lījārakī-ye Ḩasan Rūd; also known as Lejārekī, Licharaki, Lidzhariki, Lījārakī, Lījārekī, Lijariki, Lījār Key, and Līzharīkī) is a village in Licharegi-ye Hasan Rud Rural District, in the Central District of Bandar-e Anzali County, Gilan Province, Iran. At the 2006 census, its population was 1,950, in 556 families.

References 

Populated places in Bandar-e Anzali County